Petrovec is a village in the municipality of Petrovec, North Macedonia and situated about 15 km southeast of the national capital Skopje. It is the seat of the Petrovec municipality. Though rather small, the village is known throughout the country as being the nearest settlement to Skopje International Airport, the bigger of two international airports in North Macedonia (for this, Petrovec had previously been the name of the airport).

Demographics
As of the 2021 census, Petrovec had 3,132 residents with the following ethnic composition:
Macedonians 2,637
Bosniaks 164
Persons for whom data are taken from administrative sources 136
Serbs 99
Albanians 83
Others 13

According to the 2002 census, the village had a total of 2,659 inhabitants. Ethnic groups in the village include:

Macedonians 2,312
Bosniaks 118
Serbs 99
Albanians 67
Romani 53
Others 10

Sports
Local football club FK Petrovec plays in the Macedonian Third League (North Division).

References

External links
Location

Villages in Petrovec Municipality